Lucy Rose Doolan (born 11 December 1987) is a New Zealand former cricketer who played as an all-rounder, batting right-handed and bowling right-arm off break. She appeared in 40 One Day Internationals and 33 Twenty20 Internationals for New Zealand between 2008 and 2013. She played domestic cricket for Wellington Blaze, as well as stints for Essex, Nottinghamshire and South Australia. In March 2019, she announced her retirement from all forms of cricket.

References

External links

1987 births
Living people
New Zealand women cricketers
New Zealand women One Day International cricketers
New Zealand women Twenty20 International cricketers
Wellington Blaze cricketers
Essex women cricketers
Nottinghamshire women cricketers
South Australian Scorpions cricketers
Cricketers from Lower Hutt
New Zealand expatriate sportspeople in England
New Zealand expatriate sportspeople in Australia